Daniel Houghton (born 5 July 1998) is an English cricketer. He made his first-class debut on 2 April 2017 for Leeds/Bradford MCCU against Yorkshire as part of the Marylebone Cricket Club University fixtures.

References

External links
 

1998 births
Living people
English cricketers
Leeds/Bradford MCCU cricketers
People from Ormskirk